Cyrtinus mussoi is a species of beetle in the family Cerambycidae. It was described by Joly and Rosales in 1990. It is known from Venezuela.

References

Cyrtinini
Beetles described in 1990